Novoselë is a village and former municipality in Vlorë County, Albania

Novoselë may also refer to the following places in Albania:

Benjë-Novoselë, a village in the municipality of Përmet, Gjirokastër County
Novoselë, Kolonjë, a village in the municipality of Kolonjë, Korçë County
Novoselë, Maliq, a village in the municipality of Maliq, Korçë County